Richard Kempster Degener (March 14, 1912 – August 24, 1995) was an American diver. He won a bronze and a gold medal in the 3 m springboard at the 1932 and 1936 Olympics, respectively.

In April, 1936, Degener, along with many other sports champions and standouts, was honored at a banquet in Detroit, Michigan.  This banquet was the first celebration of Champions Day. In July, 1936, a plaque was presented to Detroit from the White House honoring Detroit as the City of Champions. The plaque has five "medallions" featuring athletes.  Originally the plans called for these five athletes to be a baseball player, football player, hockey player, power boat racer, and a boxer.  But Joe Louis was surprisingly knocked out in a boxing match just weeks before the plaque was to be presented.  Planners changed the boxer to a diver, to represent Degener, at the last minute.

Degener introduced the full layout in which his body seemed to soar, lazy-like and graceful in the air. This astonished the diving world and caused a buzz of admiration around the pool.  "If there is one thing I've gotten out of sports, it's that I learned to be intense and to do the job."

Degener never lost a diving contest in college during the three years he represented Michigan from 1931 to 1934 as he took the Big Ten Conference and National Collegiate championship. In AAU competition, Dick was unbeaten for years as he won 14 national indoor and outdoor diving titles. He won four outdoor AAU Nationals in the high board representing the Detroit Athletic Club, and three NCAA titles for the University of Michigan.  At the Indoor AAUs he won five straight three-meter springboard titles and two one-meter titles.

Degener later turned professional with the Billy Rose Aquacade when it opened in Cleveland. In 1971, he was inducted into the International Swimming Hall of Fame.

See also
 List of members of the International Swimming Hall of Fame
 University of Michigan Athletic Hall of Honor

References

External links

 
 

1912 births
1995 deaths
Divers at the 1932 Summer Olympics
Divers at the 1936 Summer Olympics
Olympic gold medalists for the United States in diving
Olympic bronze medalists for the United States in diving
American male divers
Medalists at the 1936 Summer Olympics
Medalists at the 1932 Summer Olympics
Michigan Wolverines men's divers